Piana di Monte Verna is a comune (municipality) in the Province of Caserta in the Italian region Campania, located about  north of Naples and about  north of Caserta.

Piana di Monte Verna borders the following municipalities: Caiazzo, Capua, Castel di Sasso, Castel Morrone, Limatola.

References

Cities and towns in Campania